Kelly the Second is a 1936 American romantic comedy film directed by Gus Meins and starring Patsy Kelly, Guinn Williams, and Charley Chase. This Hal Roach studio film was distributed by Metro-Goldwyn-Mayer. The title is a pun, "Second" referring not to lineage but a boxer's corner man (or woman in this case).

It was Chase's final feature as well as his last film for Roach after a 15-year run at the studio; Roach was phasing out short subjects and didn't feel Chase could carry a feature, so he was let go.

Plot
After a traffic incident culminating in a brawl, feisty Molly Kelly (Kelly) comes up with the idea of making truck driver Cecil Callahan (Williams) a professional boxer, aided by her boss Doc Klum (Chase). Complications arise when mobster Ike Arnold (Brophy), impressed by Cecil's punching, declares himself a partner, putting additional pressure on him to win. Further muddying the waters is Ike's girl friend Gloria (Kelton), who's set her sights on Cecil, much to Molly's dismay.

Note: The gag of Cecil becoming enraged when he hears The Irish Washerwoman was recycled from The Three Stooges' short Punch Drunks, though in that case the song was Pop Goes the Weasel.

Cast
 Patsy Kelly as Molly Kelly
 Guinn Williams as Cecil Callahan
 Charley Chase as Doc Klum
 Pert Kelton as Gloria
 Edward Brophy as Ike Arnold
 Harold Huber as Spike
 Maxie Rosenbloom as Butch Flynn
 DeWitt C. Jennings as Judge
 Syd Saylor as Dan

Many of Roach's contract players appear in uncredited bits, including Carl "Alfalfa" Switzer, Max Davidson, Charlie Hall, Harry Bernard and James C. Morton.

References

External links
 
 
 
 

1936 romantic comedy films
1936 films
American romantic comedy films
American sports comedy films
Metro-Goldwyn-Mayer films
American black-and-white films
1930s sports comedy films
1930s English-language films
1930s American films